Ten Esschen (Limburgish: Genessche) is a Dutch hamlet located in the commune of Heerlen, in the province of Dutch Limburg.

The village lies between the A76 and N281 motorways. It also borders the Sittard–Herzogenrath railway.

Gallery

References 

Heerlen
Populated places in Limburg (Netherlands)